was a Japanese politician.

Nishio was born in Ōno, Hokkaidō, now part of the city of Hokuto. After graduating Kyoto University, he became a public servant in 1973. He was appointed deputy mayor of Hakodate by its then-mayor Hiroshi Inoue in July 2003, but resigned himself in December 2006 due to a rift with the mayor over the construction of a retirement home. He beat Inoue in the mayoral election held on 22 April 2007, and took office on 27 April.

References

1949 births
2022 deaths
Mayors of places in Hokkaido
Kyoto University alumni